The 1972–73 FIBA Women's European Cup Winners' Cup, running from November 1972 to March 1973, was the second edition of FIBA Europe's second-tier competition for women's basketball clubs, subsequently renamed Ronchetti Cup. Defending champion Spartak Leningrad won its second title beating Slavia Prague in the final.

First qualifying round

Second qualifying round

Group stage

Group A

Group B

Semifinals

Final

References

1972-73
1972–73 in European women's basketball